Comet Daniel is a periodic comet in the Solar System discovered by Zaccheus Daniel (Halsted Observatory, Princeton University, New Jersey, United States) on December 7, 1909, estimated as magnitude 9.

Following its discovery, the returns for 1916, 1923, and 1930 were predicted but on each occasion it was not recovered.

The 1937 return was recovered by Shin-ichi Shimizu (Simada, Japan) on January 31 after a calculation of the comet's orbit by Hidewo Hirose (Tokyo, Japan) after he took calculations for the 1923 return done by Alexander D. Dubiago and took into account perturbations from Jupiter.

All returns apart from 1957 and 1971 have been recovered.

Repeated close encounters with Jupiter have increased this comet's orbital period steadily since it was first discovered, it will likely increase again to 8.29 years when it next encounters Jupiter on December 2, 2018.

The comet nucleus is estimated to be 2.6 kilometers in diameter.

At some point between 2009 January 11 and 30 the comet underwent an outburst of around 3 magnitudes, brightening from 18th to 15th magnitude.

References

External links 
 Orbital simulation from JPL (Java) / Horizons Ephemeris
 33P at Kronk's Cometography
 33P at Seiichi Yoshida's Comet Catalog

Periodic comets
0033
Comets in 2016
Astronomical objects discovered in 1909